Eupithecia johnstoni is a moth in the  family Geometridae. It is found in North America, including Alberta, British Columbia, California, Colorado, Michigan, New Brunswick, Ontario, Oregon and Washington.

The wingspan is about 18 mm. Adults have been recorded on wing from March to August.

References

Moths described in 1946
johnstoni
Moths of North America